Sömmerda I – Gotha III is an electoral constituency (German: Wahlkreis) represented in the Landtag of Thuringia. It elects one member via first-past-the-post voting. Under the current constituency numbering system, it is designated as constituency 16. It covers the northern part of the district of Gotha and part of western Sömmerda district.

Sömmerda I – Gotha III was created for the 1994 state election. Since 2009, it has been represented by Jörg Kellner of the Christian Democratic Union (CDU).

Geography
As of the 2019 state election, Sömmerda I – Gotha III covers the northern part of the district of Gotha and part of western Sömmerda district, specifically the municipalities of Bienstädt, Dachwig, Döllstädt, Drei Gleichen, Eschenbergen, Friemar, Gierstädt, Großfahner, Molschleben, Nesse-Apfelstädt, Nessetal, Nottleben, Pferdingsleben, Schwabhausen, Sonneborn, Tonna, Tröchtelborn, Tüttleben, and Zimmernsupra (from Gotha), and Andisleben, Elxleben, Gangloffsömmern, Gebesee, Haßleben, Henschleben, Riethnordhausen, Ringleben, Schwerstedt, Straußfurt, Walschleben, Werningshausen, Witterda, and Wundersleben (from Sömmerda).

Members
The constituency has been held by the Christian Democratic Union since its creation in 1994. Its first representative was Volker Sklenar, who served from 1994 to 2009. Since 2009, it has been represented by Jörg Kellner.

Election results

2019 election

2014 election

2009 election

2004 election

1999 election

1994 election

References

Electoral districts in Thuringia
1994 establishments in Germany
Sömmerda (district)
Gotha (district)
Constituencies established in 1994